Eubanks is an unincorporated community in Orange County, North Carolina, United States, located north of downtown Chapel Hill and south of Blackwood Station. The Orange County landfill is part of the Eubanks area; however, most of the area is rural.

References

 

Unincorporated communities in Orange County, North Carolina
Unincorporated communities in North Carolina